The list of MLS Cup winning head coaches includes six head coaches who have won multiple MLS Cup titles — Bruce Arena, who has won MLS Cup five times, and Sigi Schmid, Frank Yallop, Dominic Kinnear, Brian Schmetzer and Caleb Porter, who have each won MLS Cup twice.

To date, three head coaches have led two different clubs to win the MLS Cup: Sigi Schmid (with Los Angeles Galaxy in 2002 and Columbus Crew in 2008), Bruce Arena (with D.C. United in 1996 and 1997 and LA Galaxy in 2011, 2012 and 2014) and Caleb Porter (with Portland Timbers in 2015 and Columbus Crew in 2020).

Only two head coaches have won the playoffs as both a player and head coach. Piotr Nowak played for Chicago Fire during their 1998 MLS Cup title (in which he was named the Man of the Match), and subsequently led D.C. United as a coach to their fourth MLS Cup title in 2004. Peter Vermes won the 2000 MLS Cup with Sporting Kansas City (then known as the Kansas City Wizards) as a player, then won MLS Cup with the same team as a coach in 2013. The next closest head coaches to such an achievement are Dominic Kinnear and Greg Vanney. Kinnear was on the Colorado Rapids squad that lost the 1997 MLS Cup final; however, he led Houston Dynamo to two straight MLS Cup titles in 2006 and 2007. Vanney was on the LA Galaxy roster that finished as runners-up in 1996 and 2001, and coached Toronto FC to their victory in 2017.

Winning head coaches

Coaches with multiple MLS Cup victories

By nationality

See also
 List of Major League Soccer coaches

winning head coaches
Lists of association football managers